ExxonMobil's Baton Rouge Refinery in Baton Rouge, Louisiana is the fifth-largest oil refinery in the United States and thirteenth-largest in the world, with an input capacity of  per day as of January 1, 2020. The refinery is the site of the first commercial fluid catalytic cracking plant that began processing at the refinery on May 25, 1942.

Standard Oil first erected the refinery in 1909.  Today's facility is part of a complex made of nine individual plants across the region.  The main plant is located on the east bank of the Mississippi River.  There are about 6,300 workers spread across these sites, including 4,000 direct employees (the rest are contractors).

In 2013 Genesis Energy LP announced an investment of $125 million to improve ExxonMobil's existing assets in the Baton Rouge area. The investment includes plans to build an 18-mile, 20-inch diameter crude oil pipeline that connects Genesis Energy's Port Hudson terminal, to ExxonMobil's Baton Rouge refinery. The Baton Rouge refinery's tank farm has a capacity of 540,000 barrel-per-day (bpd).

See also 
Cancer Alley

References

External links
2007 Louisiana Crude Oil Refinery Survey Report
ExxonMobil: A Legacy of Commitment to Baton Rouge
Interview with Site Manager Stan Vanderleeuw in BIC Magazine, February 2007

Energy infrastructure completed in 1909
Oil refineries in the United States
Energy infrastructure in Louisiana
Economy of Baton Rouge, Louisiana
ExxonMobil buildings and structures